Marie-Soleil was a Canadian children's television show in the 1980s and early 1990s, which aired on many stations associated with the CTV Television Network. The show, starring children's entertainer Suzanne Pinel, used stories and songs to teach French to anglophone kids.

The series was initially produced by Mid-Canada Communications for the MCTV stations in Northern Ontario in 1984, and shot in Sudbury; however, as a resident of Ottawa, Pinel found travelling to Sudbury on a regular basis to film the show difficult to reconcile with raising her children, so after a single season it went on hiatus before production was relaunched on Ottawa's CJOH-TV in 1987.

The puppet character, an English-speaking dog named Fergus, was played by Jon Park-Wheeler. There was also a clown named Samuel, played by Suzanne Lalonde, who spoke with sign language for the hearing impaired.

The series was also later broadcast in reruns on YTV.

References

1984 Canadian television series debuts
1980s Canadian children's television series
1990s Canadian children's television series
1980s preschool education television series
1990s preschool education television series
CTV Television Network original programming
French-language media in Ontario
Sign language television shows
Television series by Bell Media
Television shows filmed in Greater Sudbury
Television shows filmed in Ottawa
French-language education in Canada